United Nations Security Council resolution 1367, adopted unanimously on 10 September 2001, after recalling resolutions  1160 (1998), 1199 (1998), 1203 (1998) and reaffirming resolutions 1244 (1999) and 1345 (2001) in particular, the Council terminated the arms embargo against the Federal Republic of Yugoslavia (Serbia and Montenegro) after it had satisfied Council demands to withdraw from Kosovo and allow a political dialogue to begin.

The Security Council noted that demands contained in Resolution 1160 had been satisfied and further recognised the difficult security situation along the administrative boundary of Kosovo and the Federal Republic of Yugoslavia. Weapons and ammunition would continue to be prevented from entering Kosovo. The Secretary-General Kofi Annan stated that the Federal Republic of Yugoslavia had allowed humanitarian organisations and United Nations High Commissioner for Human Rights access to Kosovo.

Acting under Chapter VII of the United Nations Charter, the Council terminated the arms embargo and dissolved the Committee of Security Council tasked with monitoring the sanctions.

See also
 Kosovo War
 List of United Nations Security Council Resolutions 1301 to 1400 (2000–2002)
 Yugoslav Wars

References

External links
 
Text of the Resolution at undocs.org

 1367
 1367
2001 in Yugoslavia
 1367
September 2001 events
Sanctions against Yugoslavia